The Redford Ministry was the combined Cabinet (called Executive Council of Alberta), chaired by fourteenth Premier Alison Redford, and Ministers that governed Alberta halfway through the fourth session of the 27th Alberta Legislature from October 7, 2011, to the early part of the second session of the 28th Alberta Legislature on March 23, 2014.

The Executive Council (commonly known as the cabinet) was made up of members of the Alberta Progressive Conservative Party which holds a majority of seats in the Legislative Assembly of Alberta.  The cabinet was appointed by the Lieutenant Governor of Alberta on the advice of the premier.  Members of the council are styled "the Honourable" only for the duration of their membership, not for life.

Cabinets of Alison Redford

First Cabinet 
The first Redford ministry was in place from October 12, 2011, after Redford took over the leadership of Alberta Conservatives following the 2011 leadership election, until May 8, 2012 after she won re-election.

Members are listed in order of precedence.

List of members of the Redford Ministry

See also 
 Executive Council of Alberta
 List of Alberta provincial ministers

External links
 New Cabinet team focused on Albertans' priorities

Politics of Alberta
Executive Council of Alberta
2011 establishments in Alberta
Cabinets established in 2011
Cabinets disestablished in 2014